NCAA Football 99 is a video game of the sports genre released in 1998 by EA Sports. Its cover athlete is former University of Michigan cornerback Charles Woodson.

Gameplay
The 1999 installment of EA Sports college football game. NCAA 99 features the 1998 rosters of over a hundred division 1A teams with accurate stadiums, uniforms, and (in some cases) fight songs. There are also 80 "historical" teams that allow you to recreate great college football games of the past. The featured exhibition game is a match up between the 1997 AP Poll national champion Michigan Wolverines and the 1997 Coaches Poll champion Nebraska Cornhuskers.

Reception

The game received favorable reviews on both platforms according to the review aggregation website GameRankings. Next Generation said of the PlayStation version, "Although it doesn't break any new ground, NCAA 99 has enough new features and improvements to make it a worthwhile purchase."

The staff of PC Gamer US nominated the PC version as the best sports game of 1998, although it lost to NBA Live 99. They wrote that the former "turned out to be the year's finest pigskin offering, despite a healthy challenge from EA Sports' own Madden NFL 99."

Notes

References

External links

1998 video games
College football video games
Electronic Arts games
Multiplayer and single-player video games
NCAA video games
PlayStation (console) games
Video games developed in the United States
Windows games